Bengali Harlem and the Lost Histories of South Asian America is a non-fiction book by American academic and filmmaker Vivek Bald about the historical migration of Bengali people from South Asia to the United States.

About author
Vivek Bald is an Associate Professor of Writing and Digital Media at Massachusetts Institute of Technology and a filmmaker.

Content 
The book examines the arrival of Bengali sellers in Harlem in the early part of the 20th century, and the establishment of a Bengali neighborhood in Harlem in the 1920s. The book also examines the arrival of Bengali Muslim settlers in Treme, New Orleans. The book was inspired by Habib Ullah, a sailor from Noakhali who settled in Harlem in the 1930s. The book examines passenger records and census papers to picture the life of early Bengali settlers and how they settled to largely African-American neighborhoods because of racial segregation then.

Reception
Bald was selected for a Whiting Public Engagement Fellowship for 2017-18 based on this book. The book has been called "intricately researched and exquisitely rendered," and was described in the Huffington Post as a "brilliantly revelatory book."

External links 

 Bengali Harlem website

References

2013 non-fiction books
History of Bengal
History books about Bangladesh
20th-century history books
Indian-American history
Bangladeshi American
Indian diaspora in the United States
Bangladeshi-American culture
Pakistani-American history
Harvard University Press books